Leskovo may refer to the following villages:

 Leskovë, or Leskovo, in Albania
 , in Demir Hisar Municipality, North Macedonia
 Leskovo, Vologda Oblast, in Russia (for other villages with the name in Russia, Belarus or Ukraine, see :ru:Лесково)
 Leskovo (Majdanpek), in Bor District, Serbia

See also 
 Lyaskovo (disambiguation)
 Leskova, a village in Raška District, Serbia
 Leskovac (disambiguation)